Aashish Khan Debsharma (born 5 December 1939) is an Indian classical musician, a player of the sarod. He was nominated for a Grammy Award in 2006 in the 'Best World Music' category for his album "Golden Strings of the Sarode". He is also a recipient of the Sangeet Natak Akademi Award. Besides being a performer, composer, and conductor, he is also an adjunct professor of Indian classical music at the California Institute of the Arts, and the University of California at Santa Cruz, in the United States.

Family and life

Ustad Alauddin Khan tradition
Aashish Khan was born in 1939 at Maihar, a small state of British India, where his grandfather Alauddin Khan, founder of the "Senia Maihar Gharana" or "Senia Maihar School" of Indian classical music, was a royal court musician. His mother the late Zubeida Begum was Ali Akbar Khan's first wife. He was initiated into Hindustani classical music at the age of five by his grandfather. His training later continued under the guidance of his father Ali Akbar Khan, and his aunt, Annapurna Devi. The "Senia Maihar Gharana" follows the traditional "Beenkar" and "Rababiya" pattern of the "Dhrupad" style. He has two children Faraz and Nusrat Khan from a previous marriage.

Career
Aashish Khan grew up in Maihar and Calcutta performing Indian classical music. He gave his debut public performance at the age of 13, with his grandfather, on the All India Radio "National Program", New Delhi, and in the same year, performed with his father and his grandfather at the "Tansen Music Conference", Calcutta. Since then, he has performed at major venues of classical music and world music both in the Indian subcontinent and abroad.

Aashish Khan is also a founder of the Indo-American musical group Shanti with tabla player Ustad Zakir Hussain in 1969, and later, of the fusion group, "The Third Eye". In "Shanti", Aashish Khan is featured playing the acoustic Sarode sometimes through a fender guitar amplifier with vibrato effect.

Under Ravi Shankar, he has worked as a background artist on musical products for both film and stage, including Oscar Winner Satyajit Ray's Apur Sansar, Parash Pathar, Jalsaghar, and Richard Attenborough's film Gandhi. He has also worked as a background artist with Maurice Jarre on John Huston's film The Man Who Would be King, David Lean's A Passage to India, and composed the music for Tapan Sinha's films, Joturgriha (for which he received Best Film Score Award) and Aadmi Aurat.

During 1989–1990, Aashish Khan served as the Composer and Conductor for the National Orchestra of All India Radio, New Delhi, India.

Collaborations
Aashish Khan has collaborated with such diverse western musicians as John Barham, George Harrison, Ringo Starr, The Beatles, Eric Clapton, Charles Lloyd, John Handy, Alice Coltrane, Emil Richards, Dallas Smith, Don Pope, Jorge Strunz, Ardeshir Farah, and the Philadelphia String Quartet. Ustad Aashish Khan has co-lead "Shringar" with Andrew McLean featuring notable New Orleans musicians such as Tim Green and Jason Marsalis. Shringar is the first foray of any classical Indian musician into the music culture of New Orleans, widely considered the Mecca of Jazz. His recordings include Wonderwall Music, Young Master of the Sarode, California Concert, Sarode and Piano Jugalbandi, Shanti, Live at the Royal Festival Hall London, Homage, Inner Voyage, Monsoon Ragas, The Sound of Mughal Court, and the latest, Jugalbandi Sarode & Sarangi Duet, with Ustad Sultan Khan.

Teaching
Aashish Khan is a music teacher, currently serving as adjunct professor of Indian Classical Music at the California Institute of the Arts, Los Angeles, US, and as an adjunct professor of Music at the University of California at Santa Cruz, United States. He has formerly taught at the faculties of the Ali Akbar College of Music in San Rafael, California, University of Alberta in Canada and the University of Washington, Seattle. While pursuing a busy career as a concert artist and composer, he teaches students throughout the US, Canada, Europe, and Africa, as well as India. Many of his students have established themselves as stage performers in India and abroad.

He presently divides his time principally between Calcutta, and California, where most of his students and disciples are located.

Recognition
He has been awarded the Fellowship of the Illinois Arts Council, US, in 2002, and India's highest award for performing arts, i.e., the Sangeet Natak Akademi award in 2005. In 2006, he was nominated for a Grammy Award in the 'Best World Music' category. On 24 May 2007 Ustad Aashish Khan became the first ever Indian classical musician to become a Fellow of the Royal Asiatic Society of Great Britain and Ireland, the UK's highest society in Asian arts and culture.

Religious conversion
Aashish Khan is Hindu. In September 2006, he announced at a press conference in Calcutta that since his forefathers were Hindu Brahmins of the East Bengal, and held the surname "Debsharma", he wished to use his forefathers' surname to help people understand the root of his musical lineage. He also stated that his family were never officially converted into Islam and the surname "Khan" did not necessarily imply he was a Muslim. He based this assertion on the fact that his grandfather the late Ustad Allauddin Khan wrote in his biography (Aamar Katha, (Bengali), published by Ananda Publishers, Calcutta) that his forefathers were indeed Hindus with the surname "Debsharma". He also said that his name (Aashish) and his brothers' names (Dhyanesh, Pranesh, Amaresh) were all given by their grandfather Allauddin; and these are essentially Hindi names. However, his father Ali Akbar Khan rejected Aashish's claims as fallacies. Ali Akbar Khan told the Times of India newspaper in an e-mail: "I do not support his (Aashish's) choice. Unfortunately, many statements made by my son in the newspaper regarding the history of my family are incorrect." He stated that their family has been Muslim for many generations, and will remain Muslims.

Discography
Aashish Khan: Inner Voyage; Raga Bhimpalasi (Pilgrimage), Raga Jog (Two Dimensions), Raga Mishra Kafi (Inner Voyage), Raga Mishra Gara (Remembering You), Raga Mishra Abhogi (Love Within), Raga Mishra Kafi (Under The Stars); Keyboards and Producer:  Alan Scott Bachman; and Percussion: George Grant. (DDD)
Aashish Khan: Raga Desh Malhar, Raga Mishra Sivaranjani, Raga Mishra Khamaj. Accompanists: Pranesh Khan in Tabla and Amie Maciszewski in Tanpura. Bihaan Music, Calcutta, India. (DDD)
Aashish Khan: Peace & Joy: Music For Relaxation; Raga Darbari Kanada, Raga Kaushi. Accompanist: Swapan Chaudhuri in Tabla. Ninaad Records, India (NC 0035). (DDD)
Aashish Khan & Sultan Khan: Jugalbandi – Sarode & Sarangi Duet; Live in Stuttgart 1995; Raga Shri, Raga Maru Behag, Raga Maand; Tabla: Zakir Hussain, Tanpura: Shefali Nag & Madhuri Chattopadhyay. Chhanda Dhara, Germany (SNCD 70197).(DDD)
Aashish Khan: Rainy Season Ragas; Raga Desh Malhar – Alap, Jod, Jhala, Raga Mian Ki Malhar – Gat in Tintal, Ragamalika – Gat in Tintal; Tabla: Zakir Hussain, Tanpura: Karuna Eff & Daniela Birschel. Chhanda Dhara, Germany (SNCD 70394).(DDD)
Aashish Khan & Indranil Bhattacharya: Homage to Our Guru – Jugalbandi; Raga Darbari Kanara – Alap & Jod, Raga Kirwani – Gats in Teental, Raga Khamaj in Thumri Style – Taal in Chanchar; Tabla: Anindo Chatterjee. Chhanda Dhara, Germany (SNCD 70994) & Navras Records, UK. (DDD)
Aashish Khan: Golden Strings of the Sarode; Raga Bhimpalashi, Raga Bhairavi, Raga Lalitagouri; Tabla: Zakir Hussain. Moment Records, USA (MRCD 1022) & Music Today, India. (DDD)

With George Harrison:

Wonderwall Music (1968)
Young Master of the Sarod (1967); Raga Lalit (raga), Raga Yaman (raga)

References

External links
Biography at Sony Music India
Biography  at Simlahouse
UCSC Faculty
The Times of India
India Daily
The Hindu
Chennai Online
Ustad Aashish Khan Interview
Interview on The World Music Foundation Podcast

1939 births
Indian Hindus
Converts to Hinduism from Islam
Fellows of the Royal Asiatic Society
Hindustani instrumentalists
Indian film score composers
Indian former Muslims
Living people
Sarod players
People from Satna
Recipients of the Sangeet Natak Akademi Award
20th-century Indian composers
Converts to Hinduism
Indian male film score composers
20th-century male musicians
Indian classical musicians of Bengal